The Ballroom Blitz & More Sweet Hits is a greatest hits album from British rock band Sweet, initially released in Australia in 1992 on the BMG label. Upon its release it reached number 19 on the Australian albums chart. It was also released in the United States in 1998.

Track listing
Side one
 "The Ballroom Blitz" – 4:03
 "Fox on the Run" – 3:22
 "Wig Wam Bam" – 3:02
 "Little Willy" – 3:14
 "Co-Co" – 3:10
Side two
 "Alexander Graham Bell" – 2:56
 "Funny Funny" – 2:48
 "The Six Teens" – 4:04
 "The Lies in Your Eyes" – 3:43
 "Poppa Joe" – 3:07
Side three
 "Block Buster!" – 3:14
 "Hell Raiser" – 3:20
 "Teenage Rampage" – 3:35
 "Action" – 3:19
 "Peppermint Twist" – 3:26
Side four
 "Stairway to the Stars" – 3:05
 "Jeanie" – 2:59
 "Chop Chop" – 2:57
 "Spotlight" – 2:47
 "Love Is Like Oxygen" (Album Version) – 6:50

Personnel
Sweet
 Brian Connolly – lead vocals, background vocals
 Andy Scott – guitar, synthesizer, background vocals
 Steve Priest – bass guitar, background vocals
 Mick Tucker – drums, percussion, background vocals

Charts

References

1992 compilation albums
The Sweet albums
Glam rock compilation albums